A chignon is a temporary swelling left on an infant's head after a ventouse suction cap has been used to deliver her or him. It is not a sign of serious injury and may take as little as two hours or as long as two weeks to disappear.

See also
 Caput succedaneum
 Cephalohematoma

References

External links 

Childbirth
Birth trauma
Neonatology